The Banobal stele is a Horus on the Crocodiles stele with a Phoenician graffiti inscription on a block of marble which served as a base for an Egyptian stele, found near the Pyramid of Unas in Memphis, Egypt in 1900. The inscription is known as KAI 48 or RES 1.

It was first mentioned in 1900 by Melchior de Vogüe, who had been sent a copy of the stele by Gaston Maspero, who was excavating Memphis, Egypt.

It is currently at the Egyptian Museum, with ID CG 9402 (JE 33264+34081).

Phoenician inscription
The inscription is the front of the plinth of the stele, which measures 55 x 64 x 32 cm. The text of the inscription is damaged; it has been dated to the 2nd-1st centuries BCE.

The inscription reads:

{|
|+ 
|-
| (line 1) || HMṬN’ [Z] YṬN[’T] ’NK P‘L‘ŠTRT BN ‘BDMLKT BN BNB‘L || [This] stele I erect[ed], I, Pa‘ol‘astarte, son of ‘Abdmilkot son of Binba‘al
|-
| (2) || BN ‘BDMLK[T... ...L‘ŠT?]RT ŠMR ’NKY LRBTY L’LM ’DRT ’M ’LM ‘ŠTRT WL’LNM ’Š || son of ‘Abdmilko[t... to Ast]arte(?), protector, I (ask) of my Lady, the great Goddess, mother, the goddess ‘Astarte, and of the (other) gods,
|-
| (3) || ’L [. YB]RK ’Y[TY W’YT B]NY ‘BD’SR WBNB‘L W‘BDŠMŠ WP‘L‘ŠTRT W’T ’MNM ḤN‘ŠTRT  || I ask: [May you bl]ess m[e and my s]ons — ‘Abdosir and Binba‘al and ‘Abdsemes and Pa‘ol‘astarte, and their mother Ḥan‘astarte,
|-
| (4) || [WY]TN LM ḤN WḤYM L‘N ’LNM WBN ’DM || [and may they (the gods) gr]ant them favor and (long) life in the eyes of gods and men!
|}

Charles Clermont-Ganneau suggested the name Binba‘al might be better restored Banoba'al or Hanobal.

Scholars have connected this name to Banobali or Bariobali, a Phoenician temple slave described by Cicero in In Verrem.

Gallery

Bibliography
 Daressy, Georges, 1903, Textes et dessins magiques, 9402, pages 3-11 Egypt. Maslahat al-Athar
 Vol 13: Bulletin de l'Institut d'Egypte (1930-1931), page 79
 Vol 21: Bulletin de l'Institut d'Egypte (1938-1939), page 261

References

Phoenician inscriptions
Archaeological artifacts
KAI inscriptions